Rendezvous Peak is in the Teton Range in the U.S. state of Wyoming. Situated just south of Grand Teton National Park and within Bridger-Teton National Forest, Rendezvous Peak is the highest point on Rendezvous Mountain.

References

Mountains of Wyoming
Mountains of Teton County, Wyoming